The Kelly Award could refer to: 

Michael Kelly Award, a journalism award established by the Atlantic Media Company
Ned Kelly Awards, an Australian award for crime writing